Craig Robertson (born 22 April 1963) is a Scottish former football player and coach who spent most of his career in Fife playing for Dunfermline Athletic and Raith Rovers, broken up by a spell with Aberdeen.

Playing career
Craig Robertson was born in Dunfermline in 1963. He joined Raith Rovers from Hearts  in 1980, and stayed with the Kirkcaldy-based club until 1987, when he was signed by his home town team Dunfermline Athletic for £25,000. In his first season with the Pars he was the top-scoring midfielder in the league, despite the side being relegated.

After 18 months with Dunfermline, Robertson was signed by Aberdeen in December 1988 for a fee of £150,000. His first team opportunities at Pittodrie were limited, making only 34 appearances in three seasons and so in 1991 he was re-signed by Dunfermline. After the death of Norrie McCathie in January 1996, Robertson was given the task of taking over as club captain. The first match after McCathie's death was a home tie against Clydebank in which Robertson scored in the last minute to give the Pars a 4–3 victory. The goal itself has been described by Clydebank midfielder Graham Connell as a "wonder goal", with Dunfermline fans simply referring to it as "the goal".

Robertson continued to captain the side until 1998, when he was released by the club and retired from football.

Later career
After retiring, Robertson later became assistant manager at Dunfermline Athletic, and became caretaker manager in 2006 following the resignation of Jim Leishman. In 2008, he returned to Aberdeen after being appointed as chief scout, where he remained until Derek McInnes was appointed Aberdeen manager in 2013.

Career statistics

Manager

References

External links
 
 

1963 births
Living people
Scottish footballers
Aberdeen F.C. players
Dunfermline Athletic F.C. players
Raith Rovers F.C. players
Footballers from Dunfermline
Association football midfielders
Scottish Football League players
Aberdeen F.C. non-playing staff
Dunfermline Athletic F.C. non-playing staff